Shahekou District is one of the seven districts of Dalian, Liaoning province, People's Republic of China, forming part of the urban core. It is located in the western portion of the city. Its postal code is 116021, and the district government is seated at 393 Zhongshan Road.

Geography 
The district's western portion is generally higher in elevation, and has seven notable peaks. The district has  of coastline.

Climate 

Administrative divisions
There are 7 subdistricts within the district.

Subdistricts:
Xi'an Road Subdistrict
Chunliu Subdistrict
Malan Subdistrict
Nanshahekou Subdistrict
Heishijiao Subdistrict
Lijia Subdistrict
Xinghaiwan Subdistrict

Economy 

Locomotive manufacturer CRRC Dalian has its headquarters in Shahekou District.

The Dalian Commodity Exchange is located in the district.

Education
The following secondary schools are within Shahekou District:
Dalian No. 3 High School
Dalian No. 4 Middle School
Dalian No. 8 High School
Dalian No. 13 High School
Dalian No. 47 Middle School
Dalian No. 48 High School
Dalian No. 79 Middle School
Dalian Yuming Senior High School
High School Affiliated to Liaoning Normal University

The following universities are within Shahekou District:
Dongbei University of Finance and Economics
Liaoning Normal University
Dalian Jiaotong University
Dalian Ocean University

Tourist sites 

Major sites in Shahekou District include Xinghai Square, Golden Beach and Zhongshan Park.

References

External links

Districts of Dalian